On the Moon is a 2004 album by jazz pianist, singer, and composer Peter Cincotti. It was released on the Concord label and produced by Phil Ramone.

Track listing
"St. Louis Blues" (W. C. Handy) – 4:13
"Some Kind of Wonderful" (Gerry Goffin, Carole King) – 3:30
"I Love Paris" (Cole Porter) – 3:44
"On the Moon" (Peter Cincotti) – 5:02
"Bali Ha'i" (Richard Rodgers, Oscar Hammerstein II) – 3:57
"He's Watching" (Peter Cincotti) – 4:45
"Raise the Roof" (Andrew Lippa) – 4:08
"The Girl for Me Tonight" (Peter Cincotti, Pia Cincotti) – 5:00
"You Don't Know Me" (Eddy Arnold, Cindy Walker) – 4:34
"I'd Rather Be with You" (Peter Cincotti) – 4:48
"Up on the Roof" (Gerry Goffin, Carole King) – 2:52
"Cherokee" (Ray Noble) – 3:13

Personnel
Peter Cincotti (piano, vocal)
Barak Mori (bass)
Mark McLean (drums)
Kenny Washington (drums)
Jeffrey Mironov (guitar)
Scott Kreitzer (tenor sax)
Sam Yahel (keyboard)
Wycliffe Gordon (trombone)
Bashiri Johnson (percussion)
William Galison (harmonica)
Brad Leali (alto sax)
Gary Smulyan (baritone sax)
Barry Danelian (trumpet)

Concert Master
Elena Barere

Chart performance

References 

Peter Cincotti albums
Albums produced by Phil Ramone
2004 albums